The 1959 Utah Redskins football team was an American football team that represented the University of Utah as a member of the Skyline Conference during the 1959 NCAA University Division football season. In their second season under head coach Ray Nagel, the Redskins compiled an overall record of 5–5 with a mark of 3–2 against conference opponents, placing fourth in the Skyline. Home games were played on campus at Ute Stadium in Salt Lake City.

Utah was led on the field by junior quarterback Terry Nofsinger and senior safetyand halfback Larry Wilson, a future member of the Pro Football Hall of Fame.

Conference members New Mexico and Montana were not played in 1960, and the Redskins defeated both in-state rivals: BYU by 12 points and Utah State by 14. For the first of two consecutive seasons, Utah did not face longtime rival Colorado; they first played in 1903 and had met every year except two (1909, 1918). The series resumed in 1961 and 1962, then went on hiatus until 2011, when both schools joined the Pac-12 Conference.

Schedule

NFL Draft
Utah had two players selected in the 1960 NFL Draft.

References

Utah
Utah Utes football seasons
Utah Redskins football